Shiv Kumar may refer to:

 Shiv K. Kumar (1921–2017), Indian-English writer
 Shiv Kumar Batalvi (1936–1973), Punjabi language poet